Phyllocnistis symphanes is a moth of the family Gracillariidae, known from Maharashtra and Karnataka, India. The hostplants for the species include Aglaia lawii and Aglaia littoralis.

References

Phyllocnistis
Endemic fauna of India
Moths of Asia